Bow-sim Mark (born 1942) is a Chinese martial arts grandmaster who lives in Newton, Massachusetts, US. She is the mother of martial arts film star, Donnie Yen.

Training
Mark was born in Guangzhou, Republic of China in 1942. She began studying martial arts at elementary school, training seriously in high school and then at Wushu training schools, specialising in t'ai chi ch'uan and Northern Shaolin. Mark learned Fu Style Wudangquan by training under Fu Wing Fay for 10 years; Wing Fay was the eldest son and top student of Grandmaster Fu Chen Sung. She was an instructor at Wing Fay's school from 1968 to 1974.

Career
After living for years in Hong Kong, Mark emigrated to Brighton, Massachusetts in 1975, and founded the Chinese Wushu Research Institute in July 1976. She still teaches and performs in the Boston area. She was one of the first to provide Chinese wushu instruction in the West and is credited with popularizing the term Wushu outside of China. She gave the first demonstration of Combined Tai Chi Chuan in the United States, and published the first description of the technique in 1975. Mark won a gold medal at the first International Tournament of T'ai chi ch'uan in Wuhan City in 1984. She was named Black Belt magazine's Kung-Fu artist of the year for 1995.

One of her specialities is her Wudang sword dance. She played the part of a 'kung fu diva' in a play, Mum and Shah at the Lyric Stage theater in Boston in 1995.

Black Belt Magazine named her one of the most influential martial artists of the 20th Century.

Personal life
Mark is married to the newspaper editor Klyster Yen and has two children, a son, martial arts movie star Donnie Yen, and a daughter, Chris Yen, who placed All-round Third division in the First International Wushu tournament in 1986 as the youngest competitor, and who has also joined the film industry.

References

External links
Profile from the Chinese Wushu Research Institute
(Wayback Machine copy)
Bookfinder.com's catalog of Bow Sim Mark titles
Profile from Mass. Culture Council, including a video of her performance.
Instructors – United Martial Arts Center

1942 births
Chinese tai chi practitioners
Hong Kong emigrants to the United States
Living people
Sportspeople from Guangzhou
Sportspeople from Boston
American people of Chinese descent
People from Newton, Massachusetts